Tichina Rolanda Arnold (born June 28, 1969) is an American actress and singer. She began her career as a child actor, appearing in supporting roles in Little Shop of Horrors (1986) and How I Got into College (1989) before being cast as Pamela "Pam" James on the FOX sitcom Martin, which she portrayed from 1992 until the show ended in 1997. Arnold also portrayed the family matriarch Rochelle on the UPN/CW sitcom Everybody Hates Chris from 2005 to 2009, and portrayed Judi Mann in the TV Land original sitcom Happily Divorced from 2011 to 2013. From 2014 to 2017, she acted the lead role of Cassie Calloway on Survivor's Remorse. As of 2018, Arnold portrays Tina Butler in the CBS sitcom series The Neighborhood. From 2018 to 2019, she acted the role of Paulette in the South African series Lockdown.

Early life
Arnold was born in Queens, New York City, to a working-class family. Her mother, Diane, was a sanitation worker and her father Gene Arnold was a police officer. She was raised in the Church of God in Christ. She attended the Fiorello H. LaGuardia High School of Music & Art and Performing Arts.

Career

Film and television
In 1986, Arnold appeared as Crystal, one of the three chorus girls who perform R&B numbers in Frank Oz's film musical Little Shop of Horrors (1986) along with future Martin co-star Tisha Campbell. Arnold was only sixteen at the time of filming, and her career continued steadily after that, with a role or two almost every year, including the films How I Got into College and the Paul Mazursky/Woody Allen collaboration Scenes from a Mall (1991). In February 1987 Arnold scored her first big break on television, with a permanent role on the soap opera Ryan's Hope. Her critically lauded role, as young heroine Zena Brown, landed her a Daytime Emmy Award nomination in 1988. She continued in the role until the series ended in January 1989. Later that year, Arnold was cast as Sharla Valentine, a high-school friend of Emily Ann Sago (played by Liz Vassey) on the ABC-TV daytime drama All My Children. She continued in the role until 1991.

Arnold's best-known television role was Pamela James on Martin Lawrence's sitcom Martin (1992–1997). She also played the recurring role of Nicole Barnes on the sitcom One on One. In 2000, she was reunited with Martin Lawrence in Big Momma's House. In 2007, she again reunited with Lawrence (this time as his character's wife) in the big screen road comedy/buddy film Wild Hogs. In 2003, she appeared in Civil Brand. Arnold played the role of the matriarch, Rochelle, on the sitcom Everybody Hates Chris which premiered in September 2005 and ended in May 2009. In a departure from her known comedic roles, she played the title role in The Lena Baker Story (2008), which was about the first and only woman to be executed by the electric chair in Georgia.

Arnold also played the voice of the friend in The Boondocks episode "Attack of the Killer Kung-Fu Wolf Bitch", which aired in 2007. In 2009, Arnold appeared onstage in The Wiz revival at the New York City Center in the part of Evillene, The Wicked Witch of the West. In 2010 she guest starred in the one-hour episode premiere of the Disney XD Original Series Pair of Kings as Aunt Nancy, and also reprise her role for one more episode.

Arnold played the best friend of Fran Drescher in the TV Land sitcom Happily Divorced, which is based on Fran Drescher's real-life marriage and divorce to series co-creator Peter Marc Jacobson.

Personal life
In 1998, Arnold started her own company of designer headgear called "China Moon Rags". The headbands were Swarovski crystal-embroidered bandanas. Celebrities such as her good friends Michel'le, Tisha Campbell, Janet Jackson, Vivica A. Fox, Regina King, Christina Aguilera and LisaRaye McCoy have modeled and been seen wearing Arnold's designs. When her daughter was born, she stopped production.

Arnold has a daughter, Alijah Kai Haggins (born March 16, 2004), with music producer Carvin Haggins. In an interview with Joan Rivers, Arnold revealed that she had thought she was unable to conceive after bouts with endometriosis.

On August 18, 2012, Arnold married St. Johns Men's Basketball assistant coach and former Golden State Warriors assistant coach DaRico Hines in Honolulu, Hawaii. In January 2016, Arnold's representative confirmed she and Hines were divorcing. The media reported that Hines had been unfaithful to Arnold, having made a sex tape with another woman during their marriage, which was later released to the public without his consent.

Philanthropy
In 2013, Arnold and her sister created the We Win Foundation, a foundation for people with lupus; her sister, Zenay, has the disease.

Filmography

Film

Television

Awards and nominations

References

External links

 

Tichina Arnold at TV Guide

1969 births
Living people
Actresses from New York City
African-American actresses
American television actresses
American film actresses
People from Queens, New York
Fiorello H. LaGuardia High School alumni
American women comedians
20th-century American actresses
21st-century American actresses
African-American women in business